Fredrik Riseth (born 15 September 1995) is a Norwegian former cross-country skier.

His only outing in the 2015 Junior World Championships was the sprint, where he won the gold medal. He won his second gold medal at the 2017 Junior World Championships, this time in the U23 age class.

He made his World Cup debut in the Drammen sprint in  March 2015, where he collected his first World Cup points with an 11th place. He repeated this placement in January 2018 in Dresden, and broke the top-ten for the first time in March 2018 in Drammen, where he finished seventh, again in the sprint. After he participated in only one World Cup competition during the 2019–20 season, Riseth retired from international skiing on 1 May 2020.

He represents the sports club Byåsen IL.

Cross-country skiing results
All results are sourced from the International Ski Federation (FIS).

World Cup

Season standings

References 

1995 births
Living people
Sportspeople from Trondheim
Norwegian male cross-country skiers